Saman Ansari is a Pakistani television, theater and OTT actor. 

She started acting in 2014 and is performing to date. .

Career
Saman Ansari started her career in the HUMTV drama Jugnoo opposite Zahid Ahmed and Yumna Zaidi. She is noted for playing the parallel lead in Karb alongside Armeena Rana Khan and Adnan Siddiqui. Her role as the supporting lead opposite Ahsan Khan and Hira Mani n Preet Na Kariyo Koi received critical acclaim. Karb went on air in Spring 2015 and Preet Na Kariyo Koi went on air in late 2015 and finished early 2016 on Hum TV. Ansari did her first negative role in a soap called Mera Dard Na Janay Koi.. She has done a guest appearance in two episodes of Hum TV's comedy series Mr. Shamim and played the lead role in Geo Entertainment's serial Saas Bahu. In Meri Har Nazar Teri Muntazir, which began on 10 February 2016, she plays the lead role of a doctor slammed by the tempest of life. Playing a manipulative friend who is a professional lawyer, Ansari also appeared in Hum TV's serial Lagaao, in which she is a parallel lead (antagonist) opposite Adnan Jaffar. She received accolades for her powerful role in Dumpukht-Aatish e Ishq opposite Noman Ejaz which aired on A-Plus TV. Sammi, a drama serial about women's rights Aired on Hum TV where Ansari's performance as a mother of 5 girls with many failed pregnancies in the social pressure to have a son was admired globally by Hum TV viewers. She was nominated in two categories for her performance in Sammi at the HUMTV awards in 2018 for 'Best Female Actor in a Supporting Role' and 'Best on screen Couple. 

Her most popular performances  include Geo Entertainment's Khaani, where she plays the powerful role of Sitara Mir Shah. Dar Si Jaati hay Sila brought forth her spine chilling performance of Sadia  awoman sexually abused by a male in-house relative and her constant efforts to protect her daughter from suffering the same way. This was a joint venture of Kashif Nisar and HUMTV. 

OTT performances include her leading Lady performance in Jasoosi Duniya an adaptation of the world famous theater play the psychic. The play was mentored by Mr. Zia Mohouddin and directed by Mr. Khalid Ahmed at NAPA in 2018.

Filmography

Television

References

External links 
 

Living people
Muhajir people
Pakistani television actresses
1974 births